The Democratic National Committee (DNC) Lawrence O'Brien Award was created in 1992 by the family of Lawrence Francis "Larry" O'Brien Jr. (1917–1990) and Democratic Party leaders to recognize the many years of service he gave to the party and his belief in the contribution of party volunteers. Since then, party leaders presented this award on five occasions to 94 winners from across the United States.

The award honors the importance of this contribution to the continuing success and vitality of the party. It's given to individuals and groups who exhibit a high degree of commitment and self-sacrifice on behalf of the party and its candidates.

The award was expanded in 1998 to help mark the 150th anniversary of the DNC. Party leaders honored an individual or group from every commonwealth, district, state and territory and six individuals nationally. Through the generosity of the O'Brien family, award winners also received financial grants.

A news report which was published in 2000 by Insight magazine described a 1998 controversy about e-mail messages which were written between the Clinton administration staff members and 1996 presidential reelection campaign staffers about political fundraising by administration staffers. Some of the messages were written in 1996 and solicited the award for a campaign contributor.

Selection

Award winners are selected from among many nominations received from party leaders, appointed and elected public officials, and other Democrats in the United States. Each winner worked at the local-, state- or national-party levels, including assisting candidates for elected public office. Furthermore, the winners made personal, family or financial sacrifices, or otherwise showed unusual or extraordinary dedication to the furtherance of the goals of the party, without financial remuneration or professional gain.

Winners
Miguel A. Hernández Agosto, Territory of Puerto Rico, 1998
Pongsun Choi "Sunny" Allen, State of Ohio, 1995
Patsy B. Arceneaux, State of Louisiana, 1998
Pat Banditch, State of Colorado, 1998
Rachel "Rae" Barone, State of New York, 1998
Bettina Basanow, State of Colorado, 1993
John Beemer, Commonwealth of Pennsylvania, 1998
Mitchell Berger, State of Florida, 1994
Milton Bronstein, State of Rhode Island, 1998
Raymond Buckley, State of New Hampshire, 1998
Lucy Madden Buntain, State of Nebraska, 1998
Virginia H. Cain, State of Nevada, 1998
Sara Caldwell, State of Tennessee, 1994
Ellen Callanan, Commonwealth of Massachusetts, 1998
Billie Carr, State of Texas, 1998
Bethine Church, State of Idaho, 1998
College Democrats of America, District of Columbia, 1993
Laura Comini, State of Oregon, 1998
Carolyn H. Covington, State of Alaska, 1998
Joseph F. Crangle, State of New York, 1992
Al Davidson, Democrats Abroad, 1998
Felisa Rincón de Gautier, Territory of Puerto Rico, 1992
Harold Demarest Jr., State of Oregon, 1995
Nancy Dick, State of Florida, 1998
Abbi Easter, Commonwealth of Virginia, 1998
Ed Fibiger, State of North Dakota, 1998
Irene Findlater, Commonwealth of Massachusetts, 1993
C. Pat Frank, State of Oklahoma, 1998
Anita Freedman, State of New Hampshire, 1994
Lutu Tenari Fuimaono, Territory of American Samoa, 1998
James "Jim" Gallagher, State of Oklahoma, 1998
George Gaukler, State of North Dakota, 1995
Eugenia Gil, State of Connecticut, 1998
Diane Glasser, State of Florida, 1994
Kevin Gover, State of New Mexico, 1993
Susan Gwinn, State of Ohio, 1998
Laurence Hansen, State of Minnesota, 1995
Marsha Harbaugh, State of Wyoming, 1998
Nettie Harrelson, State of New Mexico, 1995
William "Bill" Hegarty, State of Arizona, 1998
Rosa Holliday, State of Michigan, 1998
Billie Houck, State of Iowa, 1998
Anthony Hyde, Democrats Abroad, 1998
Kathy Jamison, State of Delaware, 1998
Harold Jinks, State of Arkansas, 1992
Alan Karcher, State of New Jersey, 1998
Richard Kennedy, State of New Mexico, 1998
Donna Kilpatrick, State of Montana, 1998
Peg Kirkpatrick, State of Hawaii, 1998
John Kukulka, State of Connecticut, 1994
Pauline Locklear, State of North Carolina, 1998
Sarah Lodge, State of Arkansas, 1998
Lewis Manilow, State of Illinois, 1998
Louis Martin, State of California, 1992
Joan Mathews, State of Georgia, 1992
Tony Mathews, State of Georgia, 1992
Johnoween S. Mathis, State of Texas, 1992
Charles H.A. McAlpin, Territory of U.S. Virgin Islands, 1998
Ethel McBrayer, Commonwealth of Kentucky, 1998
Jim McConaha, State of New Hampshire, 1998
Gertrude McConahay, State of Indiana, 1998
Eunice Mixon, State of Georgia, 1998
Bennie Moore, State of Florida, 1995
Fran Moyer, State of Washington, 1998
Anne Murphy, State of Colorado, 1995
David Nelson, State of Utah, 1998
Madge Overhouse, State of California, 1994
Frances Parrilla, Commonwealth of Pennsylvania, 1998
James J. Pasma, State of Montana, 1992
Carol Pensky, State of Maryland, 1994
Betsy Rader, State of South Carolina, 1998
Philip J. Rock, State of Illinois, 1992
Emma D. Sanders, State of Mississippi, 1998
Margaret Schelen, State of California, 1993
Karen Schuler, State of Maine, 1998
Gene Sisneros, State of New Mexico, 1998
Edward Smith, State of Illinois, 1995
Mark E. Sostarich, State of Wisconsin, 1998
Mariquita "Tita" Torres Souder, Territory of Guam, 1998
Alta Stephens, State of Missouri, 1998
Saul Stern, State of Maryland, 1995
Elbert "Willie" Suggs, District of Columbia, 1998
Lucille Thu, State of South Dakota, 1998
Beatrice Tignor, State of Maryland, 1998
Maida Townsend, State of Vermont, 1998
Bea Underwood, State of Minnesota, 1998
Beulah Vernon, State of Oklahoma, 1993
Pam Wallace, State of Alabama, 1998
Margaret B. Walsh, State of West Virginia, 1992
West Virginia Federation of Democratic Women, State of West Virginia, 1998
Tom Whipple, Commonwealth of Virginia, 1998
Karen Wingard, State of California, 1998
Esther Wright, State of Tennessee, 1998
Irene G. Younkman, State of Kansas, 1998

References

External links

Democratic National Committee

Democratic Party (United States)
Politics awards